Mustafa Zazai (born 9 May 1993) is an Afghan footballer who plays as a midfielder for C-League club Boeung Ket. He also plays for the Afghanistan national team.

Early life
Zazai was born in Kabul in 1993, to a Pashtun family. He moved to Germany in the following years.

Youth
Zazai played in the youth of many German clubs. He played in the youth of HSV Hamburg, Concordia Hamburg and VfB Lübeck.

Club career
After being promoted to the first team of VfB Lübeck he played 23 matches and scored 3 goals. At the end of the season he was contacted by FC St. Pauli II if he wants to play for them. He accepted the offer. He played mostly as an attacking midfielder. He scored 5 goal in 24 matches.

On 23 January 2019, Zazai signed a contract with Malaysia Premier League side, Kelantan.

International career
He was selected by the head coach for the 2014 AFC Challenge Cup in the Maldives. He was 21 years old when he gave his debut for the national team.

International goals
Scores and results list Afghanistan's goal tally first.

References

External links
VfB Lübeck Profile
soccerwiki Profile

1993 births
Living people
Footballers from Kabul
Afghan footballers
German footballers
Afghan emigrants to Germany
Afghanistan international footballers
Pashtun people
Association football midfielders
Regionalliga players
Lüneburger SK Hansa players
Kelantan FA players
Expatriate footballers in Cambodia
Phnom Penh Crown FC players